Abdul-Wahab Abu Al-Hail Labid Al-Zirjawi (born 21 December 1975) is an Iraqi professional football manager and former player who is the head coach of Iraqi club Zakho.

Club career
Abu Al-Hail started his career by playing for Al-Talaba in Iraq. He has also played for Al-Shaab of the UAE. In 2003, he moved to the Iranian Pro League club Esteghlal Ahvaz. After three seasons he joined the Esfahani club Sepahan. And stayed there for another 3 season where he won the Hazfi Cup once during his time and played many matches in ACL and CWC. He moved to Foolad for 2009–10 season but he was rejected by the new coach Majid Jalali.

Abu Al-Hail started his career with Al Talaba in 1992. He left the club in 1999, moving to Al-Akhaa Al-Ahli of Lebanon, and then to Al-Shaab of the United Arab Emirates. In 2003, he moved to Iran, playing for Esteghlal Ahvaz, Sepahan and Foolad. While at Esteghlal, Abu Al-Hail was given the captain's armband: it was the first time in the history of the Iranian league that a foreign player had become captain.

International career
Abdul-Wahab Abou Al-Hail was a key member of the Iraqi national team and one of the most coveted properties in Iraqi football. A jewel in midfield, equipped with remarkable ball control, accurate passing, shooting and is particularly threatening at free-kicks. His coach Milan Zivadinovic once described him as 'Our Ronaldo', due to his importance to the side and his short 'Ronaldoesque' hair cut. He came into the international scene during the Nehru Cup in 1997, missing a penalty in the shoot-out win over India.

At international level, Abu Al-Hail featured prominently in Iraq's qualifying campaign for the 2002 FIFA World Cup under then coach Rudolf Belin. Olympic manager Adnan Hamad called the midfielder into his squad for the 2004 Summer Olympics.

Abu Al-Hail was a member of the Iraq national football team. and was part of Iraq Olympic team in the 2004 Olympic Games, reached the 4th place. Abu Al-Hail was not selected in Iraq's title-winning 2007 AFC Asian Cup squad as the national authorities stayed faithful to players from the former youth team that had won the AFC Youth Championship 2000.

Managerial career 
Abu Al-Hail started his managerial career at Al-Talaba in 2013, remaining in charge until 2015. In December 2016, Abu Al-Hail became the head coach of his former club Akhaa Ahli Aley, in the Lebanese Premier League, for the 2016–17 season. In his second season as head coach, he finished fourth in the league. On 21 January 2020, he was appointed head coach of Ansar. He resigned on 20 March 2020, following Ansar's 2–2 draw to Safa.

On 21 April 2021, Abu Al-Hail was appointed head coach of Zakho in Iraq.

Career statistics

Club

International
Scores and results list Iraq's goal tally first.

Managerial

Honours

Player
Sepahan
 Iranian Hazfi Cup: 2005–06

Iraq
 WAFF Championship: 2002

Notes

References

External links

 
 
 Abdul-Wahab Abu Al-Hail at iraqsport.com

Living people
1975 births
Iraqi footballers
Sportspeople from Baghdad
Association football midfielders
Al-Talaba SC players
Iraqi expatriate footballers
Expatriate footballers in Lebanon
Iraqi expatriate sportspeople in Lebanon
Lebanese Premier League players
Akhaa Ahli Aley FC players
Expatriate footballers in the United Arab Emirates
Iraqi expatriate sportspeople in the United Arab Emirates
UAE Pro League players
Al-Shaab CSC players
Expatriate footballers in Iran
Iraqi expatriate sportspeople in Iran
Persian Gulf Pro League players
Esteghlal Ahvaz players
Sepahan S.C. footballers
Iraq international footballers
2000 AFC Asian Cup players
2004 AFC Asian Cup players
Olympic footballers of Iraq
Footballers at the 2004 Summer Olympics
2009 FIFA Confederations Cup players
Iraqi football managers
Iraqi expatriate football managers
Expatriate football managers in Lebanon
Lebanese Premier League managers
Akhaa Ahli Aley FC managers
Al Ansar FC managers
Iraqi Premier League managers